Berislavić is a surname, derived from the male given name Berislav. It may refer to:

Berislavići Grabarski (also Doborski), Croatian noble family
Berislavići Trogirski, Croatian noble family
Berislavići Vrhrički (also Malomlački), Croatian noble family

Croatian surnames